"I'm in Love with My Car" is a song by the British rock band Queen, released on their fourth album A Night at the Opera in 1975. It is the album's only song written entirely by drummer Roger Taylor.

History
Taylor played the guitars in the original demo, but they were later rerecorded by May on his Red Special and Taylor also doubled on electric guitar in addition to drums. The lead vocals were performed by Taylor on the studio version and all released live versions. The revving sounds at the conclusion of the song were a recording of Taylor's then current car, an Alfa Romeo. The lyrics were inspired by one of the band's roadies, Johnathan Harris, whose Triumph TR4 was evidently the "love of his life". The song is dedicated to him, with the liner notes mentioning, "Dedicated to Johnathan Harris, boy racer to the end".

When it came down to releasing the album's first single, Taylor was so fond of his song that he urged Freddie Mercury (author of the first single, "Bohemian Rhapsody") to allow it to be the B-side and locked himself in a cupboard until Mercury agreed. This decision would later become the cause of much internal friction in the band, in that while it was only the B-side, it generated an equal amount of publishing royalties for Taylor as the main single did for Mercury simply because it was the B-side to "Bohemian Rhapsody".

The song was often played live during the 1977–81 period. Taylor sang it from the drums while Mercury played piano and provided backing vocals. During the News of the World Tour, Mercury would often sing the chorus lines with Taylor.

The song's title is used as a running joke in the 2018 Queen biopic Bohemian Rhapsody, starting with an argument between Taylor (Ben Hardy) and May (Gwilym Lee) over the song's lyrical content. Later in the film, fictional EMI executive Ray Foster (Mike Myers) suggests to have it or "You're My Best Friend" released as the first single to A Night at the Opera instead of "Bohemian Rhapsody". Shortly afterwards, on Kenny Everett's radio show, Mercury hands the single to the eponymous host, who then reads out "I'm In Love With My Car" rather than "Bohemian Rhapsody", which is then correctly played on air.

Reception
Music writer Tom Reynolds described the song as "seriously, one of the greatest and most passionate love songs I've heard during the last thirty-plus years". AllMusic appreciated it as a "solid, hard hitting rocker" from Taylor. They observed, "The music lives up to the macho tone of the lyrics by matching up verses that swagger in a midtempo hard rock style", regarding it as an "album highlight".

Personnel
Roger Taylor – lead and backing vocals, drums, electric rhythm guitar
Freddie Mercury – piano, backing vocals
Brian May – electric guitar, backing vocals
John Deacon – bass guitar

References

External links

Lyrics at Queen official website

1975 songs
Queen (band) songs
Songs about cars
Songs written by Roger Taylor (Queen drummer)
EMI Records singles
Parlophone singles
Elektra Records singles
Hollywood Records singles
British hard rock songs
1975 singles